Guðrún Björnsdóttir (27 November 1853 – 11 September 1936) was an Icelandic politician and women's rights activist. She was a founder of the Icelandic Women's Rights Association and one of the first female members of the Reykjavík City Council.

Early life and family 
Guðrún Björnsdóttir was born at Eyjólfsstaðir on 27 November 1853 where she lived until the age of 10 when her father died. She was then sent to Eskifjörður for foster care, but soon moved to Langanes to live with her uncle. For a brief period she lived in Copenhagen, but after a while returned to her relatives in Langanes.

In 1884, she married pastor Lárus Jóhannesson, and in Sauðanes they raised four daughters. After only four years of marriage, Guðrún's husband died. One of her daughters would go on to die in the Spanish flu.

Guðrún stayed with her brother in Norður-Þingeyjarsýsla until she moved with her daughters to Reykjavík in 1900 where she became a milk vendor. She also began writing articles in the papers about milk sales and personal hygiene.

Political career 
Guðrún was prominent in the local women's rights movement in the early 20th century and was a founder of the Icelandic Women's Rights Association. She was one of the first women elected to the Reykjavík City Council. Alongside her in City Council were three other newly elected women; Bríet Bjarnhéðinsdóttir, Þórunn Jónassen, and Katrín Magnússon.

Guðrún sat in the town council in 1908 to 1914, focused on health and educational issues. In particular, she promoted women's education and their right to hold office. She helped towards establishing a Women's Student Scholarship Fund.

Death and legacy 
Guðrún died in Reykjavík on 11 September 1936. A memorial about her, which appeared in Morgunblaðið on 18 September 1936, wrote about her:

In November 2010, the Reykjavík City Council announced that a street in the city, would be renamed Guðrúnartún in honor of Guðrún Björnsdóttir.

Notes

References

1853 births
1936 deaths
Politicians from Reykjavík
20th-century Icelandic women
Icelandic women in politics
Icelandic suffragists